Manfred Moore (December 22, 1950 – January 11, 2020) was an American professional American football running back and, briefly, rugby league footballer who played in the 1970s.

Early years
Moore was born in Martinez, California. He graduated from San Fernando High School in San Fernando, California.  He played college football for the University of Southern California.

Professional career

NFL career
Moore was a 9th round selection (216th overall) in the 1974 NFL Draft by the San Francisco 49ers. He played for the 49ers in 1974 and 1975, being named their special teams player of the year in both seasons. He then spent the 1976 NFL season with the Tampa Bay Buccaneers, after being selected by them in the 1976 NFL expansion draft. Near the end of the 1976 season he was cut by the winless Buccaneers (0-13 at that point) and signed by the Oakland Raiders to replace their injured kick returner Rick Jennings.

Switch to rugby league

Following his Super Bowl appearance, Moore was recruited by Australian New South Wales Rugby Football League premiership team the Newtown Jets for the 1977 NSWRFL season, with the move being financed by John Singleton. He made his first grade debut just 98 days after the Super Bowl, playing on the wing against the Western Suburbs Magpies before 5,743 spectators at Henson Park. He impressed on debut, scoring the club's first try of the season. This made him the first, and to date only, person to score a first grade rugby league try in Australia and an NFL touchdown in the US. Moore lasted only four games in the NSWRFL; he was relegated to reserve grade and played in the second row before receiving a head injury in a match against Penrith which prompted him to return to the National Football League prematurely.

Return to the NFL
Moore returned to the National Football League with the Minnesota Vikings, playing twelve games in the 1977 NFL season.

References

1950 births
2020 deaths
People from Martinez, California
American football running backs
American rugby league players
San Francisco 49ers players
Sportspeople from the San Francisco Bay Area
Tampa Bay Buccaneers players
Oakland Raiders players
Newtown Jets players
American expatriate rugby league players
Minnesota Vikings players
Players of American football from California
Rugby league wingers
Footballers who switched code